Jules Clément Naudet and brother Thomas Gédéon Naudet are French-American filmmakers. The brothers, residents of the United States since 1989 and citizens since 1999, were in New York City at the time of the September 11 attacks to film a documentary on members of the Engine 7, Ladder 1 firehouse in Lower Manhattan. Jules captured the only clear footage of the first jet, American Airlines Flight 11, hitting the North Tower of the World Trade Center. The footage shot in 2001 was made into the 2002 documentary 9/11. The video camera that Jules was using that captured Flight 11 crashing into the World Trade Center is now on display in the National Museum of American History in Washington, D.C.

Early lives 

Jules and Gédéon Naudet moved to New York City with their parents Jean-Jacques and Shiva, when they were teenagers. Both graduated from the New York University's Tisch School of the Arts in 1995. During their first years at NYU, they both used the same ID card and only paid one tuition. The Naudet brothers became American citizens in 1999.

Career
Gédéon and Jules released their first film, Hope, Gloves and Redemption, in 2000, which centered on young boxers in training in the Bronx and East Harlem.  The film included coverage of the 1998 New York Daily News Golden Gloves tournament.

9/11 

The Naudet brothers were in the process of making a documentary on New York firefighters, following Antonio "Tony" Benetatos, a rookie firefighter or "probie," through his experiences in New York City Fire Department (FDNY) academy training and into a firehouse.

On the morning of September 11, Jules accompanied several firefighters as they headed out to investigate reports of a gas leak in Lower Manhattan, leaving Gédéon in the firehouse to continue filming with Benetatos. On the way to Lower Manhattan, Jules and the firefighters had stopped at the corner of Lispenard and Church Streets when American Airlines Flight 11 flew right over them. Jules filmed its impact as it flew directly into the North Tower of the World Trade Center (WTC).

Jules went with the FDNY into the North Tower as they responded to the incident. He entered the lobby of the North Tower with the FDNY and filmed the fire chiefs as they set up a command post and sent firefighters up the stairs. While inside, Jules filmed the evacuating civilians and the firefighters' reactions to subsequent events, including United Airlines Flight 175 hitting the South Tower, the debris and "jumpers" falling from the upper floors, and obstructed communications. When the South Tower began to collapse, he took shelter with Battalion 1 Chief Joseph W. Pfeifer and the remaining firefighters, using his camera's floodlight to help them gather the wounded, lost, and deceased as they evacuated the North Tower. He followed the firefighters as they headed north and tried to establish another command post.

Meanwhile, Gédéon filmed Benetatos (by now, the only firefighter left in the firehouse) taking calls from the other departments, but eventually took to the streets out of worry for Jules. He walked for some time, filming people's reactions and the damage done by flying debris, and managed to film the impact of Flight 175 into the South Tower. Realizing that he could not get any closer to the WTC, he returned to the firehouse, where he filmed the arrival of various off-duty firefighters. He caught the arrival of retired Battalion 1 Chief Larry Byrnes, but was unable to follow him and Benetatos as they left for the WTC. Gédéon resumed filming the people's reactions as the South Tower collapsed before returning to the firehouse and joining a trio of off-duty firefighters as they headed out to the disaster area. Unable to follow the firefighters to the North Tower, he remained in the area and filmed his surroundings.

When the North Tower collapsed, the Naudets fled with the rest of the people still in the area. Jules and Chief Pfeifer took shelter between two cars before returning to the WTC to assess the situation; less than a block away, Gédéon helped an FBI agent carry a civilian who had been overcome by the dust before making his way to a deli to recuperate. Worrying for Jules, he attempted to return to the WTC's ruins, but was turned away by police patrols. He then returned to the firehouse and filmed the returning firefighters' reactions to the attacks. Meanwhile, Jules returned with Chief Pfeifer's group and had an emotional reunion with his brother.

The Naudets' video footage became some of the most comprehensive on-site coverage of the 9/11 attacks in New York. Their film was one of only two sources of video footage of Flight 11 striking the World Trade Center, the other being a video shot by Pavel Hlava (an immigrant worker from the Czech Republic); additionally, a series of web camera images from Wolfgang Staehle show the approach of Flight 11 and the after-impact.

2004–present

In 2004 the Naudets produced Seamus, a "coming-of-age" story, with screenplay by the brothers and their 9/11 partner, James Hanlon.

The Naudets produced In God's Name, exploring current events through the thoughts of 12 spiritual leaders:
 Rowan Williams, Archbishop of Canterbury, head of the Anglican Communion
 Pope Benedict XVI, head of the Catholic Church
 Mata Amritanandamayi, Hindu holy figure
 Yona Metzger, Ashkenazi Chief Rabbi of Israel
 Ayatollah Mohammad Hussein Fadlallah, prominent Shi’ite Muslim leader
 The Dalai Lama, head of Lama (Tibetan) Buddhism
 Kitashirakawa Michihisa, High Priest of the Shinto Grand Shrine of Ise
 Alexy II, Patriarch of Moscow and head of the Russian Orthodox Church
 Bishop Mark Hanson, Presiding Bishop of the Evangelical Lutheran Church in America and then President of the Lutheran World Federation
 Frank Page, then President of the Southern Baptist Convention
 Muhammad Sayyid Tantawy, Imam of Al-Azhar Mosque and president of Al-Azhar University and a prominent Sunni Muslim leader
 Joginder Singh Vedanti, Jathedar of the Akal Takht, the Sikhs' highest authority
It was first broadcast in the United States on December 23, 2007.

A companion book to the film, called In God's Name: Wisdom from the World's Great Spiritual Leaders, was published by National Geographic Books in March 2008.

Featuring interviews with all 20 living White House chiefs of staff and two presidents, Jimmy Carter and George H. W. Bush, the latest documentary The Presidents' Gatekeepers was broadcast on September 11, 2013, on Discovery Channel.

In June 2018, they released November 13: Attack on Paris on Netflix, a documentary featuring interviews about the November 2015 Paris attacks.

In collaboration with Chris Whipple, the Naudets produced and directed The Spymasters: CIA In the Crosshairs, which includes interviews with all twelve living (current and former) Directors of Central Intelligence. It first aired on Showtime in the United States on November 28, 2015.

In 2022 they released January 6th on Discovery+, a documentary featuring interviews about the January 6 United States Capitol attack.

Personal life
Jules Naudet is married to Jacqueline Longa, with two children. Gédéon is married to Aude C and has two children.

References

External links 

1970 births
1973 births
French emigrants to the United States
Living people
Survivors of the September 11 attacks
Film directors from New York City
Sibling duos
Sibling filmmakers
Tisch School of the Arts alumni